Ptakowice  is a village in the administrative district of Gmina Zbrosławice, within Tarnowskie Góry County, Silesian Voivodeship, in southern Poland.

The village has a population of 748.

The name of the village is of Polish origin and comes from the word ptak, which means "bird".

The Black Trout Adit, part of the Historic Silver Mine in Tarnowskie Góry, a UNESCO World Heritage Site, is located in Ptakowice.

In 1822, calamine deposits were discovered in the village. In 1861, the village had a population of 714.

Transport
The A1 motorway runs nearby, south of the village.

References

Ptakowice